Tsinghua Holdings Corp., Ltd. is a wholly owned subsidiary of Tsinghua University, itself a public university in China. The company was established as an in-house asset management company for Tsinghua's subsidiaries that were established in the 1990s by the technology transfer of research to business.

Company officials
Hu Haifeng, the son of then Chinese President and General Secretary of the Communist Party Hu Jintao, was appointed in 2009 as the Party Committee Secretary of Tsinghua Holdings.

As of 2017, the Party Committee Secretary of Tsinghua Holdings was Long Dawei,

which also served as the vice-chairman. The current chairman was Xu Jinghong.

Rong Yonglin was the former chairman of the holding.

History
Tsinghua Holdings was formally formed in 2003 (though preliminarily tested in 2001) in response to the 2001 policy of separating universities and university-owned enterprises; all the shares of subsidiaries of Tsinghua University were transferred to Tsinghua Holdings. Announced by State Council of China in 2001, the plan aimed to separate ownership and management of holdings, bring on professional business managers, and separate assets of operating business and non-operating business. The university itself did not invest in other companies directly thereafter, but through the holding companies. The role of the university is to supervisor holding companies via nominating the board of directors with oversight for business plans, major investments, salary structure and other roles.

The predecessor of Tsinghua Holdings, Beijing Tsinghua University Enterprise Group, was incorporated on 26 August 1992. The university used an established company to become a new holding company in 2001 for its subsidiaries. According to 2010 Annual Report of Tsinghua Holdings, some assets unrelated to its business scope were transferred back to the university.

Subsidiaries

Chengzhi Shareholding

Chengzhi Co., Ltd was set up in Jiangxi province; its controlling shareholder is Tsinghua Holdings, and it was part of the corporate structure used in the acquisition of Shijiashuang Yongsheng Huatsing Liquid Crystal Co.

Tsing Capital
Tsing Capital describes itself as a clean tech venture capital arm of Tsinghua Holdings.

Tsinghua Tongfang

Tsinghua Tongfang Co., Ltd. is involved in consumer electronics and energy, software outsourcing, manufacture of PC hardware, and the manufacture of LEDs.  A particular field was the Nuctech Container Inspection System.

Tsinghua Unigroup

Tsinghua Unigroup is a fabless semiconductor company that is 51 percent owned by Tsinghua Holdings and 49 percent owned by Beijing Jiankun Investment Group; the latter is led by Tsinghua Unigroup chairman and CEO Zhao Weiguo. In December 2013, it acquired Spreadtrum, now Unisoc, then acquired RDA Microelectronics in 2014. In 2016, Tsinghua Unigroup, Hubei Province and the Chinese national "Big Fund" invested in Yangtze Memory Technologies. The $24 billion project employs about 6,000 people, with offices in Shanghai, Beijing and Silicon Valley. In 2017, Tsinghua Unigroup formed Shanghai JV, a joint-venture with ChipMOS of Taiwan. In 2019, it formed a subsidiary to produce DRAM memory chips.

References

External links
 

Companies based in Beijing
Tsinghua University
Government-owned companies of China
Zhongguancun
Chinese companies established in 2001